The New York State Psychiatric Institute, located at the Columbia University Irving Medical Center in the Washington Heights neighborhood of Manhattan, New York City, was established in 1895 as one of the first institutions in the United States to integrate teaching, research and therapeutic approaches to the care of patients with mental illnesses. In 1925, the Institute affiliated with Presbyterian Hospital, now NewYork-Presbyterian Hospital, adding general hospital facilities to the institute's psychiatric services and research laboratories.

Through the years, distinguished figures in American psychiatry have served as directors of the Psychiatric Institute, including Drs. Ira Van Gieson, Adolph Meyer, August Hoch, Lawrence Kolb, Edward Sachar and Herbert Pardes. The most recent director was Dr. Jeffrey Lieberman.

History
The institute was established in 1895 by the New York State Hospital Commission as the Pathological Institute of the New York State Hospitals. In 1907, its name changed to Psychiatric Institute of the State Hospitals. The 1927 Mental Hygiene Law designated it as the New York State Psychiatric Institute. In December 1929, the institute opened as a unit of the Columbia-Presbyterian Medical Center, owned and operated by the state of New York under the supervision of the Department of Mental Hygiene.

Other names
It is also known by the following names:
New York State Psychiatric Institute and Hospital 
NYSPI (New York State Psychiatric Institute) 
Columbia-Presbyterian Medical Center. New York State Psychiatric Institute 
New York (State). New York State Psychiatric Institute 
New York (State). Psychiatric Institute 
New York (N.Y.). New York State Psychiatric Institute 
New York (State). State Psychiatric Institute

Buildings
The institute has two buildings: the Herbert Pardes Building at 1051 Riverside Drive was built in 1998 and was designed by Peter Pran and Timothy Johnson of Ellerbe Becket. It is connected by walkway bridges to the high-rise Lawrence G. Kolb Research Laboratory at 40 Haven Avenue at West 168th Street, built in 1983 and designed by Herbert W. Reimer.
Their original building at 722 West 168th Street became the Mailman's School of Public Health in 1999.

Death of Harold Blauer
In 1953, Harold Blauer, a patient undergoing treatment for depression at the institute, died following an injection of the amphetamine MDA given without his permission as part of a U.S. Army experiment. The United States and New York state governments and the Psychiatric Institute attempted to cover up the incident, a fact accidentally discovered in 1975 during a Congressional inquiry on an unrelated matter. In 1987 a federal judge ordered the government to pay US$700,000 in compensation to Blauer's surviving daughter.

References
Notes

Bibliography
 Levy, Eric, "The New York State Psychiatric Institute: Revolutionizing The Study of Mental Illness", P&S Journal, Fall 2003, Columbia University (website archived 2008)

External links

 The New York State Psychiatric Institute
 History of NYSPI, Columbia Psychiatry Department website

Psychiatric hospitals in New York (state)
State University of New York statutory colleges
Columbia University research institutes
Hospitals established in 1895
New York State Department of Mental Hygiene
Medical research institutes in New York (state)